"Wonder Could I Live There Anymore" is a song written by Bill Rice, and recorded by American country music artist Charley Pride.  It was released in May 1970 as the first single from the album From Me to You.  The song was Pride's fourth number one in a row on the country charts.  The single went to number one for two weeks and spent a total of 15 weeks on the top 40.

Chart performance

References

1970 singles
Charley Pride songs
Songs written by Bill Rice
Song recordings produced by Jack Clement
RCA Records singles
1970 songs